is a Japanese actor from Osaka Prefecture. He is most famous for his portrayal of Eiji Takaoka in the tokusatsu series GoGo Sentai Boukenger.

His first on-screen appearance was as an extra in the 2003 American film, The Last Samurai.

He made a return to the tokusatsu genre in 2010, appearing as the Trigger Dopant in Kamen Rider W Forever: A to Z/The Gaia Memories of Fate. In 2013, he played Tessai/Kyoryu Grey, the pilot of Bunpachy, in Zyuden Sentai Kyoryuger.

Filmography

External links
Profile at Kart Promotion Co., Ltd
Old personal blog
Current personal blog

People from Osaka Prefecture
Japanese male actors
Living people
1981 births